is a Japanese fencer. At the 2012 Summer Olympics he competed in the men's foil, but was defeated in the second round. He won a silver medal in the team foil event.

Career

Chida's father Kenichi was selected for the 1980 Summer Olympics in Moscow, but he could not attend the event due to Japan's boycott of the Games. He however made no attempt to push his son into fencing; Kenta chose the sport for himself during his first year at junior high school. He was originally right handed, but his father suggested that he switch to fencing with his left hand to gain a competitive advantage.

Chida began fencing in the senior category in the 2002–03 season, then joined the national team and began training under national coach Oleg Matseichuk. Chida made his breakthrough in 2006–07 season: he climbed his first World Cup podium with a bronze medal in the Tokyo World Cup, followed by another bronze in the Cairo Grand Prix. These results allowed him to enter the Top 20.

At the 2008 Summer Olympics, he competed in the men's individual foil, finishing 11th, losing to Benjamin Kleibrink, the eventual champion, in the second round.

Chida graduated in 2009 from the Faculty of Letters of Chuo University.

References

Japanese male foil fencers
Living people
Olympic fencers of Japan
Fencers at the 2008 Summer Olympics
Fencers at the 2012 Summer Olympics
1985 births
Olympic silver medalists for Japan
Olympic medalists in fencing
Medalists at the 2012 Summer Olympics
People from Kesennuma, Miyagi
Asian Games medalists in fencing
Fencers at the 2006 Asian Games
Fencers at the 2010 Asian Games
Fencers at the 2014 Asian Games
Asian Games gold medalists for Japan
Asian Games silver medalists for Japan
Asian Games bronze medalists for Japan
Medalists at the 2006 Asian Games
Medalists at the 2010 Asian Games
Medalists at the 2014 Asian Games